Sancha of León (1013–1067) was a princess and queen of León.

Sancha of León may also refer to:
Sancha Raimúndez (c. 1095/1102–1159), Leonese infanta, daughter of Queen Urraca and Raymond of Burgundy
Sancha, heiress of León (1191/2–after 1230), eldest child of Alfonso IX of León by his first wife, Theresa of Portugal

See also
Sancha of Castile (disambiguation)